Purdon's Pennsylvania Statutes is an unofficial consolidation of the statutes of the Commonwealth of Pennsylvania, a state of the United States of America.

Overview
Pennsylvania's statutes are organized into seventy-nine topic groups, ranging from "Aeronautics" to "Zoning," spread across one hundred and seven volumes. 

An alternate publication, "Purdon's Pennsylvania Statutes Annotated," includes the text of statutes, as well as cross-references, footnotes, and commentary developed over two centuries. The annotated version is comparable to the United States Code Annotated.

In 2007, the Pennsylvania General Assembly struck a deal with Thomson West to post an unofficial version of the statutes for free online, making it the last state to freely provide its statutes online.

See also
 Pennsylvania Consolidated Statutes
 Law of Pennsylvania

References

External links
Unofficial Purdon’s Pennsylvania Statutes and Constitution at Thomson Reuters

Government of Pennsylvania
Pennsylvania law